The British Boxing Board of Control (BBBofC) is the governing body of professional boxing in the United Kingdom.

History
The British Boxing Board of Control was formed in 1929 from the old National Sporting Club and is headquartered in Cardiff.

Until 1948, it had a colour bar in effect by means of its Rule 24, which stated that title contestants "must have two white parents".

The British Boxing Board of Control initially refused to grant Jane Couch a professional licence on the sole ground that she was a woman, and argued that PMS made women too unstable to box. Claiming sexual discrimination and supported by the Equal Opportunities Commission, Couch managed to have this decision overturned by a tribunal in March 1998.

The British Boxing Board of Control gives out the British Boxer of the Year award. Natasha Jonas became the first woman to win this award upon winning it for the year of 2022.

Councils 
The Board divides the country into seven Area Councils: the Scottish Area, the Northern Ireland Area, the Welsh Area, the Northern Area, the Central Area (including the Isle of Man), the Southern Area, and the Midlands Area. There was previously a Western Area, which was merged with the Southern Area.

Lonsdale Belt

The Board also sanctions bouts for British boxing's most prestigious title: the Lonsdale Belt. The Lonsdale Belt is awarded to the champion of the United Kingdom in each respective weight class and to win the belt outright it must be defended against a British challenger on at least three occasions.

Scoring 

The Board is known for its unique scoring system.  Except for title fights (where the bout is scored by three judges, none of whom serve as fight referee), the referee is the sole scorer.  After the bout (if the fight goes to points decision), the referee hands his decision to the MC and the winner is announced, the referee then raising the arm of the winner – or, in the event of a draw, both boxers' arms.

British Champions

See also 
 List of British heavyweight boxing champions
 List of British light-heavyweight boxing champions
 List of British middleweight boxing champions
 List of British welterweight boxing champions
 List of British lightweight boxing champions
 List of British featherweight boxing champions
 List of British bantamweight boxing champions
 List of British flyweight boxing champions
 Commonwealth Boxing Council
 Amateur Boxing Association of England
 List of British world boxing champions

References

External links 
Official site

Boxing in the United Kingdom
Organisations based in Cardiff
Professional boxing organizations
Boxing
1929 establishments in the United Kingdom